Steve Gan (born May 22, 1945) is a Chinese-born Filipino comics artist. He is best known for co-creating Panday with Carlo J. Caparas
and Marvel Comics' Star-Lord and Skull the Slayer.

Biography
Steve Gan was born as Santos S. Gan but changed his first name to "Steve" in admiration of Steve Ditko. Gan studied architecture at the Mapúa Institute of Technology and later worked as an artist in the Komiks industry. It was as Steve Gan that he got a huge break drawing for American comic book publisher Marvel Comics, sending work through his United States-based agent, the Filipino comic book artist Tony DeZuñiga. In 1974, Gan began drawing for Marvel Comics and contributed to their line of black-and-white magazines including Savage Tales and Dracula Lives. He co-created Star-Lord and Skull the Slayer with writers Steve Englehart and Marv Wolfman respectively. Gan was highly regarded for his artwork on both Conan titles Conan the Barbarian and Savage Sword of Conan from 1974 - 1979.

Gan briefly worked for Warren Publishing in the early 1980s. After leaving the comics industry, he became a layout designer and storyboard artist in the animation field. Upon the release of the Guardians of the Galaxy film in 2014, Gan was given both a credit in the movie and royalties for co-creating Star-Lord.

Personal life
Gan is married with three children.
He retired from drawing comics fulltime in 2002,  speaking at a convention
in 2014 he spoke about walking away from drawing in the medium 12 years ago.

Bibliography

Marvel Comics
 Conan the Barbarian #58–63 (1976)
 Deadly Hands of Kung Fu #16 (1975)
 Dracula Lives #12–13 (1975)
 Marvel Premiere #28 (1976)
 Marvel Preview #4 (Star-Lord), 19 (Solomon Kane) (1976–1979)
 Savage Sword of Conan #1, 5, 13, 25, 51 (1974–1979)
 Savage Tales #6–9, 11–12 (1974–1975)
 Skull the Slayer #1–3, 6 (1975–1976)
 Tarzan Annual #1 (1977)

Warren Publishing
 Creepy #122, 134–135 (1980–1982)

References

External links
 

1945 births
20th-century Filipino artists
21st-century Filipino artists
Chinese animators
Chinese comics artists
Chinese illustrators
Comics inkers
Filipino animators
Filipino comics artists
Filipino illustrators
Filipino people of Chinese descent
Filipino storyboard artists
Living people
Mapúa University alumni